Theodor Emil Schummel (23 May 1786, Breslau—24 February 1848) was a German entomologist who specialised in Diptera.
Schummel was a private tutor in Breslau. He was a member of Schlesische Gesellschaft für vaterländische Cultur (Silesian Society for Patriotic Culture) a largely scientific society which received royal ratification in 1809 after the draft of its constitution was sent to the government in Königsberg and published many of his shorter scientific papers on insects in the society's journal Übersicht der Arbeiten und Veränderungen der Schlesischen Gesellschaft für Vaterländische Kultur, abbreviated Übers Arb. Ver. Schles. Ges. Vaterl. Kult.

Works
Partial list

1829. Beschreibung der in Schlesien einheimischen Arten einiger Dipteren-Gattungen. 1. Limnobia. Meigen. Beitrage zur Entomologie, Breslau 1: 97-201 Monograph on Limoniidae.
 1832. Versuch einer genauen Beschreibung der in Schlesien einheimischen Arten der Familie der Ruderwanzen Ploteres. 56 p., 4 pls. Monograph on Gerromorpha
 1833. Versuch einer genauen Beschreibung der in Schlesien einheimischen Arten der Gattung Tipula. Meigen. Bachmukke. Beitrage zur Entomologie, Breslau 3: 9–128.Monograph on Tipulidae

References 
 Evenhuis, N. L. 1997, Litteratura taxonomica dipterorum (1758–1930). Volume 1 (A-K); Volume 2 (L-Z). Leiden, Backhuys Publishers.
 Letzner, K. W. 1858, Die entomol. Sektion der schles. Ges. für vaterl. Kultur in ihrem 50jähr. Bestehen. Breslau. 16 - 18

1786 births
1848 deaths
18th-century German scientists
19th-century German scientists
German entomologists
Dipterists
People from Prussian Silesia
Writers from Wrocław